The Independent Book Publishers Association (IBPA) is a not-for-profit membership organization serving the independent publishing community through advocacy and education. With nearly 3,000 members, IBPA is the largest publishing trade association in the United States. IBPA programs and publications include the Benjamin Franklin Awards, Publishing University,
 and the monthly Independent Magazine. IBPA was founded in 1983 as the Publishers Association of Southern California (PASCAL). It later became the Publishers Marketing Association (PMA). It adopted its present name in 2008.

Benjamin Franklin Awards
The Benjamin Franklin Awards honor independent publishers and self-published authors for excellence in book editorial and design.  Prizes are given in a number of categories. IBPA members, as well as librarians, reviewers, editors and bookstore owners choose the winners and provide feedback to the authors about their books.

Publishing University
IBPA's Publishing University is a two-day networking and educational event. Hosted annually, the program includes learning labs and a book-award ceremony.

Independent Industry Standards 
In March 2017, the IBPA Advocacy Committee published an Industry Standards Checklist for a Professionally Published Book. The purpose of the checklist is to give independent publishers an at-a-glance gauge of the professional presentation of any book in order to help level the playing field between indie publishers and large-scale conglomerates.

Award Winners 

1995 Thomas DeBaggio for Growing Herbs from Seed, Cutting, and Root

References

External links
 
 Benjamin Frankin Awards
 List of Benjamin Franklin Award winners

1983 establishments in California
Arts and media trade groups
Trade associations based in the United States
Publishing-related professional associations
Organizations established in 1983